Lielvārde  is a military air base in Rembate Parish, Ogre Municipality in the Vidzeme region of Latvia. It was built in 1969 for an attack aircraft regiment.

In spring 1980, the 899th Fighter Aviation Regiment, part of the 1st Guards Stalingradsko-Berlinskaya Red Banner Fighter Aviation Division, 15th Air Army, moved from Riga-Rumbula also in Latvia to Lielvārde. In July 1981 the regiment was redesignated as a Fighter-Bomber Aviation Regiment, and shifted to the 39th Fighter-Bomber Aviation Division, still within the Air Forces, but now within the Air Forces of the Baltic Military District, as they had become in 1981. The 899th Regiment was withdrawn to Buturlinovka, Voronezh Oblast, in June–July 1993.

The base was transferred from Russia to Latvia in 1994 and now forms the core of operations for the Latvian Air Force.

Between 2007 and 2014 the air base underwent a major modernization, including the construction of a new administrative headquarters building (opened in 2009) and a state-of-the-art runway and taxiways.  In September 2016, Latvia's Defence Minister Raimonds Bergmanis said infrastructure at the air base was "being constructed and modernized at a fast pace" in preparation for a Canadian-led multi-national NATO battalion expected to deploy to Latvia in the spring of 2017.

On 24 February 2022, 20 Boeing AH-64D/E Apaches from 1st Battalion (Attack Reconnaissance), 3rd Aviation Regiment, 12th Combat Aviation Brigade arrived for NATO exercises.

See also 
 Ämari Air Base
 Šiauliai Air Base

References

External links

Latvian airbases
Soviet Air Force bases
Soviet Frontal Aviation
Ogre Municipality
Vidzeme